The New York City Police Department Cadet Corps is a form of internship with the New York City Police Department.

See also 

Mohammad Salman Hamdani

References

External links 
Official website

Cadet Corps
Internship programs